Liu Xiening, also known by her English name Sally Liu or simply Sally, is a Chinese actress, singer and dancer. She is a former member of South Korean girl group Gugudan. She achieved recognition in China after finishing sixth in the survival show "Produce Camp 2020", where she became a member of girl group BonBon Girls 303 for two years. Following the group's disbandment in July 2022, Liu is currently active as an actress.

Early life 
Liu was born in Shenzhen, Guangdong Province, China on October 23, 1996. She attended Beijing Contemporary Dance Academy with the hope of becoming a dancer or member of a dance group. Her plan changed when, in 2015, she was scouted by representatives of Jellyfish Entertainment. After passing the audition process, she moved to South Korea, where she became a trainee under the talent agency.

Career

Pre-debut 
Prior to her training period in South Korea, Liu appeared in a commercial in China.

2016-2018: Gugudan 

She had been a trainee for five mere months before she debuted as a member of Gugudan on June 28, 2016, with the mini album Act.1 The Little Mermaid. Liu was positioned as the group's lead dancer and rapper.

Gugudan went on to release their second mini album, Act.2 Narcissus, in February 27, 2017. 

In the same year, Liu became the regular host of OnStyle's beauty-focused variety show, "主題派對". She also performed as a dancer at the 5th V Chart Awards in Macau. It marked her first time completing a solo schedule without other Gugudan members.  

On November 8, Gugudan released their first single album, Act.3 Chococo Factory. 

The group released their second single album, Act.4 Cait Sith, on February 1, 2018. The same year also saw Liu coming back to China temporarily to film her debut web drama, "Hello Debate Opponent". Following her return to South Korea, Gugudan released their third single album, Act.5 New Action, on November 6.  

The end of the promotion period for the mini album was quickly followed by the group's first ever solo concert. Titled “gugudan 1st Concert Play”, it was held on December 1 and 2 at the Ewha Womans University Auditorium in Seodaemun District, Seoul.

2019: Gugudan's Hiatus and Return to China 
As Gugudan kicked off the start of their fourth year, the group's number of activities began to decline drastically and they entered their unofficial hiatus era. During this time, Liu made her way back home to China. 

On April 15, "Hello Debate Opponent" was broadcast on Mango TV.

On July 12, Liu announced on her official Weibo account that she had joined Hot Idol. The agency would work with Jellyfish Entertainment to manage all her activities in China. 

Later that year, Liu participated in Supernova Games 2019, which was broadcast on Tencent Video from October 12 to November 9.

2020: "Time to Bloom", Produce Camp 2020, Gugudan's Disbandment 
On February 21, Liu released her first Chinese digital single, titled "Time to Bloom".

On April 8, it was announced that she would be participating as a contestant on the survival show "Produce Camp 2020." The show itself started broadcasting on Tencent Video on May 2. While taking part on the show, she revealed in an interview that the members of Gugudan had been asked to leave their dorm by the agency, indicating that the group was on the brink of disbandment. Meanwhile, Liu went on to become one of the most popular contestants and ended up ranking sixth, hence becoming a member of the project girl group BonBon Girls 303. 

BonBon Girls 303 officially debuted on August 11 with the release of their first mini album, titled The Law of Hard Candy. Liu was known as the main visual and main dancer of the group. 

On December 30, Jellyfish Entertainment confirmed the status of Gugudan, stating that the group would officially disband on December 31.

2021-July 2022: Re-Debut with BonBon Girls 303 

In January 2021, Liu and her fellow members of BonBon Girls 303 started filming the variety show, "She Fighter". The show followed the girls as they learned the arts of Wing Chun and worked as the employees of a martial arts academy in Shanghai. It also featured actresses Zhang Yuqi and Ada Choi, crosstalk actor Qin Xiaoxian and singer/actor Dong Youlin. The show had eight episodes and was broadcast on Tencent Video in March.

On April 12, Liu was revealed to have moved to a new agency, T Entertainment. It managed most of the artists previously under Hot Idol, including Liu, after the agency went out of business. 

On April 27, BonBon Girls 303 released their second EP, Fearless Girls. 

In August, Liu took part in the dance variety show, "Masked Dancing King". She appeared in two episodes, disguised as the character 人间精灵. While competing on the show, Liu suffered from a minor neck injury, which prevented her from fully participating in BonBon Girls 303's music video for their bonus single, "Before Autumn".

On October 18, Liu began shooting her second web drama, "Give You My Heart". She wrapped filming on December 27.  

On March 14, 2022, Liu was officially disclosed as a cast member of the short web drama "Night of Love with You". This was her first time playing the lead female character. The production wrapped on March 31. 

BonBon Girls 303 released their third EP BonBon Voyage, with its lead single "Me And My Girls" on May 20.

Liu continued her foray into acting with "Story of Kunning Palace", which started production on May 21. She portrayed the character Princess Shen Zhiyi in the much-anticipated big-budget web series. 

Amidst the filming process, BonBon Girls 303 announced their disbandment on July 4. The group's pre-recorded online farewell event was broadcast on Tencent Video on July 24.

July 2022-present: New Journey as an Actress 
Two days prior to BonBon Girls 303's disbandment, the short drama "Night of Love with You" premiered on Tencent Video on July 2. It quickly gained a lot of following, continuously placing within the top ranks of various popularity lists alongside bigger, normal-length dramas. On October 11, it was reported that "Night of Love with You" was the short drama with the most playback in the Q3 of 2022. Additionally, Liu's character, Luo Qing, ranked 16 and 20 at Vlinkage's and AiMan's most popular character indexes on July 18 and 19 respectively.

Liu wrapped filming for "Story of Kunning Palace" on September 8. 

In October, Liu filmed her cameo appearance in "Destined". 

On December 12, Liu was announced as a cast member in the drama, "Wu Geng Ji". She would play Bei Er, a siren. 

On December 13, Liu began filming for the variety show, "Memories Beyond Horizon".

Liu reunited with her "Kunning Palace" co-star, actress Bai Lu, on January 4, 2023, when she filmed her cameo appearance in the latter's drama "Only for Love". 

On February 8, Liu released her first single in three years, titled "城市Lady". The song was part of a compilation album, which featured tracks by Liu and five other young up-and-coming artists. The album premiered exclusively on Soda Music streaming app. 

On February 24, Jellyfish Entertainment announced that the agency and Liu have agreed to terminate her contract. As of then, Liu has been managed by T Entertainment alone.

Discography

Singles

Filmography

Television Series

Television Shows

Notes

References

External links 

 Liu Xiening on Sina Weibo
 Liu Xiening on Instagram
 Liu Xiening on Douyin
 Liu Xiening on bilibili
 Liu Xiening on Xiaohongshu

1996 births
Living people
Singers from Shenzhen
Chinese K-pop singers
K-pop singers
Chinese Mandopop singers
Korean-language singers of China
BonBon Girls 303 members
21st-century Chinese women singers
Chinese expatriates in South Korea
Jellyfish Entertainment artists
Produce 101 (Chinese TV series) contestants